Andreas Schröder (born 8 July 1960 in Jena) is a German former wrestler who competed in the 1988 Summer Olympics and in the 1992 Summer Olympics.

References

External links

 

1960 births
Living people
Sportspeople from Jena
People from Bezirk Gera
German male sport wrestlers
Olympic wrestlers of East Germany
Olympic wrestlers of Germany
Wrestlers at the 1988 Summer Olympics
Wrestlers at the 1992 Summer Olympics
Olympic bronze medalists for East Germany
Olympic medalists in wrestling
Medalists at the 1988 Summer Olympics
World Wrestling Championships medalists
Recipients of the Patriotic Order of Merit in bronze
20th-century German people
21st-century German people